Praealticus is a genus of combtooth blennies found throughout the Pacific and Indian oceans.

Species
There are currently 14 recognized species in this genus:
 Praealticus bilineatus (W. K. H. Peters, 1868)
 Praealticus caesius (Seale, 1906)
 Praealticus dayi (Whitley, 1929)
 Praealticus labrovittatus Bath, 1992 (Crenulate-lipped rockskipper)
 Praealticus margaritarius (Snyder, 1908)
 Praealticus margaritatus (Kendall & Radcliffe, 1912)
 Praealticus multistriatus Bath, 1992
 Praealticus natalis (Regan, 1909) (Christmas rockskipper)
 Praealticus oortii (Bleeker, 1851)
 Praealticus poptae (Fowler, 1925) (Marianas rockskipper)
 Praealticus semicrenatus (W. M. Chapman, 1951)
 Praealticus striatus Bath, 1992
 Praealticus tanegasimae (D. S. Jordan & Starks, 1906)
 Praealticus triangulus (W. M. Chapman, 1951)

References

 
Salarinae
Taxa named by Leonard Peter Schultz
Articles containing video clips